Colin Vance (10 October 1929 – 16 August 2018) was an Australian rules footballer who played with South Melbourne in the Victorian Football League (VFL).

A full forward, Vance surprised onlookers in his debut in Round 1, 1955 when he attempted his first set shot with a place kick, which had long disappeared from the game; the kick was well wide of the goals. He occasionally used place kicks throughout his junior and senior career. He played only three senior games for South Melbourne, and later played for Sandringham in the Victorian Football Association.

Notes

External links 

1929 births
2018 deaths
Australian rules footballers from Victoria (Australia)
Australian Rules footballers: place kick exponents
Sydney Swans players
Sandringham Football Club players